Les Braqueuses is a 1994 French comedy crime film, directed by Jean-Paul Salomé.

Plot
Four young women from Montélimar, France resort to robbing a sex shop to help make ends meet. Unfortunately, the 1500 franc (€230) loot isn't enough to cover their bills. Hoping for a bigger payoff, they carefully plan a bank robbery. Will Cécile, Muriel, Bijou and Lola thwart the police and succeed in making off with the money?

Cast
 Catherine Jacob as Cécile Lambardant
 Clémentine Célarié as Bijou
 Alexandra Kazan as Muriel
 Nanou Garcia as Lola
 Annie Girardot as Cécile's mother
 Jean-Claude Adelin as Xavier
 Jacques Gamblin as Thierry
 Laurent Spielvogel as Monsieur Leroux
 Abbes Zahmani as Monsieur Ted
 Harry Cleven as Max
 Roland Amstutz as Bernachon

References

External links

1994 films
1990s French-language films
1990s crime comedy films
French crime comedy films
Films directed by Jean-Paul Salomé
1994 comedy films
1990s French films